Houssam Diab is Lebanese lawyer and diplomat currently serving as Lebanon Ambassador Extraordinary and Plenipotentiary to the Federal Republic of Nigeria.

Education 
Diab was educated at American University of Beirut, Lebanon where he received a degree in Sciences in 1990 before obtaining a degree in Arts and Business from same University in 1992. He earned a bachelor’s degree in Law from Lebanese University, Beirut in 1994.

Career 
Diab began his diplomatic career in the 1990s when he joined the foreign ministry. He was posted to the Lebanon Embassy in Washington, D.C., as First Secretary in 1995 and served until 1999 when he was appointed Counsellor, Deputy Chief of Mission at the Permanent Mission of Lebanon to the United Nations, New York. Diab rose through the ranks to the position of Consul General of Lebanon in Los Angeles from 2008 to 2010 and later transferred to the Consulate in Detroit in 2011. He was appointed ambassador in 2012 and deployed to the Sultanate of Oman in 2013 and served there until 2017 when he was deployed to the Federal Republic of Nigeria.

References 

American University of Beirut alumni
Lebanese University alumni
Lebanese lawyers
Lebanese diplomats
Living people
Year of birth missing (living people)